John Horne (died 1755) was the Governor of Bombay from 22 September 1734 to 7 April 1739.

References

Governors of Bombay
Year of birth missing
1755 deaths